Ronnie Carroll Freeman, Jr. (born September 24, 1973) is an American Christian musician, pianist, and worship leader. He has released five studio albums, Ronnie Freeman, God Speaking, Perfect Love, If This Is What It Means, and Paradise.

Early life and background
Ronnie Carroll Freeman, Jr., was born on September 24, 1973, in Montgomery, Alabama, to Ronnie Sr. and Glenda Freeman. He was raised with two younger brothers, Joseph and Jonathan. Freeman graduated from Southeastern University, in 1995, after that he was a worship pastor, before relocating to Nashville, Tennessee in 2002 to pursue his professional music career.

Music career
His music recording career began in 2002, with the studio album, Ronnie Freeman, that was released on May 21, 2002, by Rocketown Records. The subsequent studio album, God Speaking, was released on January 8, 2008, with Koch Records. He released, Perfect Love, on June 21, 2011, from Brentwood Benson Records. Freeman's fourth studio album, If This Is What It Means, was released on August 30, 2012, by Elevate Entertainment. His fifth studio album, Paradise, was released on August 15, 2015, from Plaid Sky Records.

Personal life
Freeman has been married to Leslie Rae Perkins, since 1996, and together they have three children, their oldest two named Hannah and Josiah, where they reside around Nashville, Tennessee.

Discography
Studio albums
Ronnie Freeman (May 21, 2002, Rocketown)
God Speaking (January 8, 2008, Koch)
Perfect Love (June 21, 2011, Brentwood Benson)
If This Is What It Means (August 30, 2012, Elevate)
Paradise (August 15, 2015, Plaid Sky)

References

External links
 

1973 births
Living people
American performers of Christian music
Musicians from Montgomery, Alabama
Songwriters from Alabama